

Archosauromorphs

New taxa

Pterosaurs

New taxa

Sauropterygians

Newly named plesiosaurs

References

1840s in paleontology
Paleontology